Kobilje Creek (or ) is a stream in northeastern Slovenia and western Hungary. Its source is at Kamenek Hill and it flows through Kobilje, crosses the Slovenian–Hungarian border, returns to Slovenia, and joins the Ledava from its left side in the town Lendava. It is the longest tributary of the Ledava.

History and name
Kobilje Creek was first mentioned in 1208 as aguam Kobula. In 1236, it was mentioned as Kebela, in 1329 as Kebelie, and in 1338 as Kebele. Its Slovene name is derived from Slavic *kobyla 'mare'. The current Slovene names for the stream are derived from the settlement of Kobilje. However, based on medieval sources, it was originally called *Kobilja (voda) (literally, 'mare stream') and the settlement of Kobilje was named after it. The stream was then later renamed after the settlement.

See also 
List of rivers of Slovenia

References

External links

Rivers of Prekmurje
Rivers of Hungary
International rivers of Europe